Laughing in the Face of a Dead Man is an EP by the post-punk band Death of Samantha, released September 1, 1986 on Homestead Records.

Release and reception 

Although noting that Death of Samantha's sound remained largely the same, Glenn Kenny of Trouser Press found the EP to be more entertaining and worthwhile when compared to the band's debut.

Track listing 
All songs written by John Petkovic, except "Werewolves of London" by LeRoy Marinell, Waddy Wachtel and Warren Zevon.

Personnel 
Adapted from the Laughing in the Face of a Dead Man liner notes.

Death of Samantha
 Doug Gillard – guitar
 David James – bass guitar, backing vocals
 John Petkovic – vocals, guitar
 Steve-O – drums

Additional musicians and production
 Chris Burgess – production
 Death of Samantha – production
 Rudolph Vasalino – design
 Steve Wainstead – photography

Release history

References 

1986 EPs
Death of Samantha albums
Homestead Records EPs